Still Corners are a British/American dream pop band formed in 2007 consisting of songwriter/producer Greg Hughes and vocalist Tessa Murray.

History
Murray met Hughes by chance at a train stop in London when the train was diverted to an alternate station. Murray is originally from England and Hughes grew up in Arizona and Texas and moved to England for a number of years to pursue a life in music.

Still Corners self-released their debut EP, Remember Pepper?, on 13 June 2008, followed by a 7-inch single, "Don't Fall in Love", released by UK label The Great Pop Supplement on 30 August 2010.

The duo signed with record label Sub Pop in 2011 and issued their first full-length debut, Creatures of an Hour, to favourable reviews.

In October 2012, the band released a new single, "Fireflies", which was named "Best New Track" by Pitchfork.

They released their second album, Strange Pleasures, on Sub Pop on 7 May 2013. The second single, "Berlin Lovers", received widespread coverage.

They released their third album, Dead Blue, on 16 September 2016 on their own Wrecking Light Records label. Still Corners shared the video for the album's first single, "Lost Boys".

On 18 August 2018, the band released their fourth album Slow Air via Wrecking Light Records.  Following the release Still Corners toured extensively in Europe, North America, and Asia.

Their fifth album The Last Exit, again via Wrecking Light Records, was released on 22 January 2021. The album was preceded by three (digital) singles. The band also announced a European tour in October 2021 in support of the new album on their website.

Band members
 Tessa Murray – vocals, keys
 Greg Hughes – multi-instrumentalist/producer/engineer

Discography

Studio albums
 Creatures of an Hour (2011, Sub Pop)
 Strange Pleasures (2013, Sub Pop)
 Dead Blue (2016, Wrecking Light)
 Slow Air (2018, Wrecking Light)
 The Last Exit (2021, Wrecking Light)

Singles and EPs
 Remember Pepper? CD EP (2007, self-released)
 "Don't Fall in Love" 7-inch (2010, The Great Pop Supplement)
 "Eyes" (Rogue Wave cover) digital (2010, self-released)
 "History of Love" split 7-inch with The New Lines (2011, The Great Pop Supplement)
 "Cuckoo" 7-inch (2011, Sub Pop)
 "Endless Summer" promo CD (2011, Sub Pop)
 "Into the Trees" promo CD (2011, Sub Pop)
 "Cabot Cove" flexi 7-inch (2011, Sub Pop)
 "Fireflies" 7-inch (2012, self-released)
 "Berlin Lovers" digital (2013, Sub Pop)
 "Horses at Night" digital (2015, self-released)
 "Lost Boys" digital (2016, Wrecking Light)
 "Down with Heaven and Hell" digital (2016, Wrecking Light)
 "Black Lagoon" digital (2018, Wrecking Light)
 "The Photograph" digital (2018, Wrecking Light)
 "The Message" digital (2018, Wrecking Light)
 "The Calvary Cross" cover Richard Thompson (musician), digital (2019, Wrecking Light)
 "Crying" digital (2020, Wrecking Light)
 "The Last Exit" digital (2020, Wrecking Light)
 "White Sands" digital (2021, Wrecking Light)
 "Heavy Days" digital (2021, Wrecking Light)
 "Far Rider" digital (2022, Wrecking Light)

Compilation appearances
 "Endless Summer" on Gruff Trade EP (2010, Fierce Panda)

Media usage

References

External links

Musical groups established in 2007
Musical groups from London
Dream pop musical groups
Sub Pop artists